The Marvel Cinematic Universe (MCU) is an American media franchise and shared universe centered on superhero films and other series starring various titular superheroes independently produced by Marvel Studios and based on characters that appear in American comic books published by Marvel Comics. The shared universe, much like the original Marvel Universe in comic books, was established by crossing over common plot elements, settings, cast, and characters. Over the course of the films and related media (such as Disney+ miniseries), several teams and organizations have been formed, each with different aims and purposes.

Teams and factions

Avengers

The Avengers are the central team of protagonist superheroes of "The Infinity Saga" within the Marvel Cinematic Universe. Created by Nick Fury and led primarily by Steve Rogers / Captain America, the team is a United States-based organization composed mainly of enhanced individuals committed to the world's protection from threats. The Avengers operate in New York State; beginning at Avengers Tower in Midtown Manhattan, and subsequently, from the Avengers Compound in Upstate New York.

They were foreshadowed in the 2008 film, Iron Man, in which the "Avengers Initiative" was referenced by Nick Fury in a post-credit scene. The team first appear in The Avengers (2012), consisting of Tony Stark / Iron Man, Steve Rogers / Captain America, Bruce Banner / Hulk, Thor, Natasha Romanoff / Black Widow, and Clint Barton / Hawkeye. The lineup that was depicted by Joss Whedon is primarily based on the Ultimates of Ultimate Marvel, with the exception of two classic founders, Hank Pym / Ant-Man and the Janet van Dyne / The Wasp. In Avengers: Age of Ultron, Pietro Maximoff and Wanda Maximoff joins the Avengers before the Battle of Sokovia while Vision, James Rhodes / War Machine, and Sam Wilson / Falcon and  also joins them in a new team roster led by Rogers. In Captain America: Civil War, the Avengers break apart into two teams, one led by Rogers and one led by Stark. In Avengers: Infinity War,  the Avengers battle Thanos, and Stark officially makes Peter Parker / Spider-Man a member of the team. In Avengers: Endgame, five years after the events of Infinity War, Nebula, Rocket, Carol Danvers / Captain Marvel, and Scott Lang / Ant-Man join the Avengers as well.

The Avengers appear in the films The Avengers, Avengers: Age of Ultron, Captain America: Civil War, Avengers: Infinity War, Captain Marvel (mid-credits scene), and Avengers: Endgame; as well as the Disney+ series Loki (archival footage). Alternate versions of the team also appear in the animated Disney+ series What If...?. Individual members of the Avengers are central characters in almost all films of the MCU.

Children of Thanos

The Children of Thanos were an elite team of powerful individuals who used their abilities to serve their adoptive father Thanos. As Thanos's vicious generals, they assisted him in his mission to find and harness the power of the Infinity Stones. Thanos adopted six known children: Ebony Maw, Proxima Midnight, Corvus Glaive, Cull Obsidian, Gamora, and Nebula, and trained them in the ways of combat, turning each of them into a deadly warrior. Over the years, Gamora and Nebula would both turn on Thanos, while the rest of his children continued to serve him faithfully. In 2018, once Thanos initiated his crusade to acquire the six Infinity Stones, he sends them to Earth in order to retrieve the Time and Mind Stones. Maw and Obsidian attempt to remove the former from Doctor Strange's Eye of Agamotto while Glaive and Midnight attempt to steal the latter from Vision, but they are each killed by members of the Avengers. Five years later, alternate versions of the Children of Thanos from 2014 time-travel to 2023 and participate in the battle between Thanos's forces and the Avengers, Guardians of the Galaxy, Masters of the Mystic Arts, and Ravagers. Obsidian and Glaive are killed during the battle, while Maw and Midnight both disintegrate after Stark uses the Infinity Stones to snap his fingers. An alternate version shown in What If...? shows how Thanos lost the team to the Collector when he became good.

They appeared in the films Avengers: Infinity War and Avengers: Endgame; as well as the Disney+ animated series What If...?, in which they are referred to as the Black Order.

Dora Milaje

The Dora Milaje, also known simply as the Dora, are an elite organization of female bodyguards and Wakanda's special forces. The current general is Ayo. Florence Kasumba portrays Ayo, a member of the Dora Milaje, in Captain America: Civil War, as a guard of T'Challa. They next appear in Black Panther. Florence Kasumba reprises her role, Danai Gurira portrays Okoye, and Sydelle Noel portrays Xoliswa while the unnamed Dora Milaje are portrayed by Marija Abney, Janeshia Adams-Ginyard, Maria Hippolyte, Marie Mouroum, Jénel Stevens, Zola Williams, Christine Hollingsworth, and Shaunette Renée Wilson. After Killmonger takes over Wakanda and seemingly kills T'Challa, the Dora Milaje reluctantly stand by him as they must remain loyal to the throne. After T'Challa returns, the Dora Milaje fight Killmonger, though Xoliswa is killed in the process.
In 2018, the Dora Milaje join the Avengers in defending Wakanda from Thanos's forces., whilst they fight Thanos's forces again in 2023.
In 2024, after Bucky Barnes breaks Helmut Zemo out of prison, the Dora Milaje pursue the latter, and eventually capture him before sending him to the Raft. Ayo advises Barnes not to return to Wakanda for some time, though he is able to ask them to create a suit for Sam Wilson.

They appeared in the films Captain America: Civil War, Black Panther, Avengers: Infinity War, Avengers: Endgame, and Black Panther: Wakanda Forever; as well as the Disney+ television series The Falcon and the Winter Soldier and What If...?.

Guardians of the Galaxy

 

The Guardians of the Galaxy are a band of outlaws who joined to protect the galaxy from threats. The group's founding members are Star-Lord, Gamora, Drax, Rocket, and Groot. The team's membership is later expanded with the addition of Yondu Udonta and Mantis while temporarily aided by Nebula in their fight against Ego. Kraglin also assists the team in the final confrontation. Four years later, they aid Thor and the Avengers in confronting Thanos in his attempt to collect the six Infinity Stones. Thanos succeeds in collecting all of Stones, murdering Gamora in the process, and disintegrates half of all life in the universe, with Star-Lord, Drax, Mantis, and Groot among his victims, with only Rocket and Nebula spared. After Thanos has destroyed the Stones and is executed by Thor, Rocket and Nebula help the Avengers travel back in time to retrieve the Infinity Stones from the past. They are successful, but the Thanos of 2014 becomes aware of the presence of this other Nebula, and has her captured, sending 2014 Nebula to the present in the former's place. 2014 Nebula summons Thanos to the present, where he destroys Avengers headquarters in order to acquire the Stones to kill the entire universe. Nebula successfully convinces 2014 Gamora to join her in opposing Thanos, and kills her 2014 counterpart, though 2014 Gamora has no emotional connection to Quill. The combined forces of the Avengers, the Guardians and all of their allies succeed in repelling his forces, and killing Thanos once and for all. Afterwards, Nebula and Thor joins the Guardians, quipping that they are now the "Asgardians of the Galaxy", and jokingly argues with Star-Lord over command of the team. 
Following the events of "Avengers: Endgame", the Guardians are still in search of the time displaced Gamora of 2014, who has no memories of her time on the team.  In the opening events of the film "Thor: Love & Thunder" the asgardian is shown getting back into shape and in search of clarity.  Thor is shown on a number of adventures battling alongside the Guardians in a lineup including Kraglin, now sporting (though still adjusting) the late Yondu's "fin & yaka arrow". The kronan warrior "Korg" also briefly holds a spot assisting the "Guardians of the Galaxy".  Both Thor & Korg leave the Guardians in search for answers upon learning of gods being murdered across the universe. As depicted in "Marvel's Guardian of the Galaxy Holiday Special", the team, having gained a large amount of money and resources by saving the universe, buy the former home of "The Collector". The giant severed, inhabited head of a Celestial known as "Knowhere", to be used as their base of operations. Cosmo the Spacedog then joins the team.

They appeared in the films Guardians of the Galaxy, Guardians of the Galaxy Vol. 2, Avengers: Infinity War, Avengers: Endgame, and Thor: Love and Thunder; as well the Disney+ television special The Guardians of the Galaxy Holiday Special and the animated series What If...?.

Guardians of the Multiverse
The Guardians of the Multiverse is a group consisted of superheroes and supervillains from across the Multiverse. The group was assembled by the Watcher with the goal of stopping an alternate version of Ultron from destroying the Multiverse. The group's members are Peggy Carter / Captain Carter, T'Challa / Star-Lord, Thor, Erik "Killmonger" Stevens, Gamora, Natasha Romanoff / Black Widow, and Stephen Strange / Doctor Strange Supreme. After a lengthy battle, the team defeats Ultron, but Killmonger enters into a duel with Arnim Zola over the Infinity Stones. Strange Supreme then casts a spell which imprisons the two inside a pocket dimension before the team is disbanded, returning to their universes by the Watcher. However, Romanoff is transported to another universe, as her own universe was destroyed by Ultron.

They appeared in the animated series What If...?.

Howling Commandos

The Howling Commandos are an elite combat unit that had been led by Captain America (portrayed by Chris Evans) during World War II. At the end of the war and after Captain America's apparent demise, their unit continued to be active and was led by Dum Dum Dugan (portrayed by Neal McDonough). They are first introduced in Captain America: The First Avenger. They were made up of men freed from a Hydra prisoner camp by Rogers. Their number also included Bucky Barnes, Gabe Jones, James Montgomery Falsworth, Jim Morita, and Jacques Dernier (portrayed by Sebastian Stan, Derek Luke, JJ Feild, Kenneth Choi, and Bruno Ricci respectively). In Agents of S.H.I.E.L.D., the team uses old Howling Commandos' equipment provided by Agent Antoine Triplett who is the grandson of one of the Howling Commandos. Commandos Dugan and Morita also return in a flashback, led by Peggy Carter. They also appear in Agent Carter.

They appeared in the film Captain America: The First Avenger and Agent Carter, as well as the Disney+ animated series What If...?.

Revengers

The Revengers is a team of ex-Sakaar prisoners assembled by Thor to escape the planet and defeat Hela. The team consists of Thor, Loki, Hulk, Valkyrie, Korg, and Miek. With the exception of Loki, who is choked to death by Thanos, the team survives Ragnarok and the attack on the Statesman.

They appeared in the film Thor: Ragnarok and the Disney+ series Loki (archival footage).

Salem Coven
The Salem Coven was a witch coven based in Salem, Massachusetts. In 1693, during the Salem witch trials, the coven brought one of its members, Agatha Harkness, to the woods. She begged to be spared but was tied to a wooden post with magic bonds. Evanora Harkness, her mother, inquired if she was a witch, which Agatha admitted to. Evanora responded by saying she had betrayed her coven and stole knowledge above her place and that she practiced the darkest of magic, which Agatha denied. The witches tried to kill Agatha with energy beams as Agatha pleaded with Evanora. Agatha continued to cry until her powers took over and she reversed the effect of the beams onto the witches and killed them. Agatha broke free of the post and killed Evanora before taking the brooch off her mother's corpse and flew away.

It appeared in the Disney+ series WandaVision.

Starforce

The Starforce is an elite military task force of skilled Kree warriors in the service of the Kree Empire. Led by Yon-Rogg (portrayed by Jude Law in the 2019 film Captain Marvel), the group also includes Vers, Korath, Minn-Erva, Att-Lass, and Bron-Char (portrayed by Brie Larson, Djimon Hounsou, Gemma Chan, Algenis Perez Soto, and Rune Temte, respectively). The group is first seen going to the planet Torfa to rescue a Kree scout named Soh-Larr. Vers is captured in a Skrull ambush led by Talos, but escapes to Earth and makes contact with Yon-Rogg. Following a parley with Talos and the discovery of the Skrull refugees hidden by Mar-Vell, Starforce arrives on Earth and takes prisoner the Skrulls, Nick Fury, Maria Rambeau, and Goose. Vers, in her regained identity of Carol Danvers, is placed in a transmission with the Supreme Intelligence. After breaking free and overheating the implant that limited her abilities, Carol Danvers fights Starforce and Kree soldiers to rescue Nick Fury, Maria Rambeau, and the Skrulls; most of the antagonizing Kree are killed or incapacitated.

They appeared in the film Captain Marvel.

Strategic Operations Command Center

The Strategic Operations Command Center, also known by its acronym SOCC, was a special task force led by Thaddeus Ross in order to hunt down the Hulk. Part of the United States Army, the SOCC tracked Banner down in Rio de Janeiro, Brazil and attempted to arrest him, but Banner transforms into the Hulk and manages to escape. The SOCC then confront the Hulk at Grayburn College and arrest Banner, but are forced to become temporary allies with him during his fight with the Abomination in Harlem.

It appeared in the film The Incredible Hulk.

Valkyrie

The Valkyrie were a group of female Asgardian warriors who served under Odin. Described by Thor as a "legend", the Valkyrie were sworn to protect the throne and fly on winged horses. During one of their missions, they were sent by Odin to Hel in order to prevent his daughter, Hela, from escaping. However, Hela single-handedly murdered all but one of the Valkyrie before Odin arrived and stopped her. Deeply traumatized by the experience, the sole surviving Valkyrie leaves Asgard and becomes a bounty hunter, serving the Grandmaster on Sakaar as "Scrapper 142".

They appeared in the film Thor: Ragnarok.

Warriors Three

The Warriors Three are a group of Asgardian warriors/adventurers, made up of Hogun, Fandral, and Volstagg, with Fandral initially portrayed by Joshua Dallas, Hogun portrayed by Tadanobu Asano, and Volstagg portrayed by Ray Stevenson. They often fight alongside Thor and Lady Sif. Zachary Levi later replaces Joshua Dallas as Fandral. They are ultimately killed by Hela during her takeover of Asgard.

They appeared in the films Thor, Thor: The Dark World, and Thor: Ragnarok; as well as the Disney+ animated series What If...?.

Companies

Advanced Idea Mechanics

Advanced Idea Mechanics, better known by its acronym A.I.M., was a scientific research and development company that was founded by Aldrich Killian. In 1999, Killian attempted to recruit Tony Stark, but failed and was instead approached by Maya Hansen, who agreed to join the organization and develop the Extremis genetic manipulation technology. Over the years, A.I.M. gathered an army of Extremis soldiers, but many of them became unstable and exploded. To cover the accidents up, Killian hired failed actor Trevor Slattery to pose as the Mandarin and claim responsibility for the "attacks". The Mandarin's actions eventually caught the attention of Tony Stark, whose mansion was later destroyed by A.I.M., while Killian kidnapped U.S. President Matthew Ellis. Killian is ultimately stopped by Stark and James Rhodes, and is then killed by Pepper Potts.

It appeared in the film Iron Man 3.

Bestman Salvage
Bestman Salvage was a company based in New York owned and run by Adrian Toomes. Other employees included Phineas Mason, Herman Schultz, Jackson Brice, and Randy Vale. This company went defunct following the Department of Damage Control taking over their contracts, leading to Toomes choosing a life of crime to support his family.

It appeared in the film Spider-Man: Homecoming.

Bishop Security
Bishop Security is a security company owned and operated by the Bishop family in New York City.

It appeared in the Disney+ series Hawkeye.

F.E.A.S.T.

Food, Emergency Aid, Shelter & Training, better known by its acronym F.E.A.S.T, is an American non-profit charitable organization. In 2024, May Parker worked for F.E.A.S.T. to feed the poor and the hungry in New York. During one of her shifts, the recently displaced Norman Osborn seeks shelter at the F.E.A.S.T. Community Center, and is tended to by May until her nephew Peter Parker arrives to escort him to the New York Sanctum, housing all the other displaced individuals from across the multiverse.

It appeared in the film Spider-Man: No Way Home.

Goodman, Lieber, Kurtzberg & Holliway
Goodman, Lieber, Kurtzberg & Holliway, better known by its initialism GLK&H, is an American law firm operating in New York City and Los Angeles.

It appeared in the Disney+ series She-Hulk: Attorney at Law.

Hammer Industries

Hammer Industries is an American weapons manufacturing company formerly led by Justin Hammer, until his arrest at the Stark Expo. Following Tony Stark's unprecedented announcement that his company would no longer manufacture weapons, Hammer Industries received the weapons contract for the United States Armed Forces. However, despite its claims, most of the weapons produced by Hammer Industries are defective or weak.

It appeared in the film Iron Man 2.

Pym Technologies

Pym Technologies was a multinational technology and scientific research company founded by Hank Pym and later taken over by his protégé, Darren Cross. Following his departure from S.H.I.E.L.D., Pym founded the company to study quantum mechanics, but was later voted out of his own company by Cross and his daughter, Hope van Dyne. Obsessed with recreating the fabled Pym Particles, Cross eventually succeeded and created the Yellowjacket suit, hoping to sell it to the military or terrorist organizations and planning to rename the company Cross Technologies. He is ultimately stopped by Pym, van Dyne, and Scott Lang, and the company's headquarters is destroyed.

It appeared in the film Ant-Man.

Roxxon Corporation

Roxxon Corporation is a large industrial conglomerate that frequently comes into conflict with S.H.I.E.L.D. and other superheroes due to its willingness to use unethical methods.

It appeared in the films Iron Man, Iron Man 2, and Iron Man 3; the Marvel One-Shot A Funny Thing Happened on the Way to Thor's Hammer; as well as the ABC series Agents of S.H.I.E.L.D. and Agent Carter, the Netflix series Daredevil, the Freeform series Cloak & Dagger, the Hulu series Runaways and Helstrom, and the Disney+ series Loki.

Stark Industries

Stark Industries is a company founded by Howard Stark and later handed over to Tony Stark. During World War II, a young Howard Stark assists the Strategic Scientific Reserve in their Super Soldier program, and provides key assistance to Steve Rogers and Agent Peggy Carter. The Stark Industries logo is modified to fit in with the 1940s time period. When Tony becomes CEO, the company is featured with a logo similar to those of Northrop Grumman and Lockheed Martin, and touted as developing many of the same weapons systems that Lockheed Martin is/was responsible for developing, such as the F-22 Raptor and F-16 Fighting Falcon. After Tony's father Howard dies, Obadiah Stane becomes the CEO and later abdicates when Tony grows old enough to run it. After Stark comes back from Afghanistan, he announces that he is closing the weapons division of the company, causing the company's stocks to fall by about 40.7%.

In 2010, Pepper Potts, Stark's lover and eventual wife, becomes the CEO of the company. Stark Industries, for the first time since 1974, hosted the renowned Stark Expo in Flushing Meadows.  In 2012, Tony Stark opens the Stark Tower in New York City. After the Chitauri invasion, almost all the lettering forming the word 'STARK' on the side of the tower falls off, leaving only the 'A' - mirroring the logo of the Avengers that would replace the lettering later on. In 2013, Pepper is still the CEO of Stark Industries and Happy Hogan is the head of security. Happy calls out to an off-camera secretary named Bambi in reference to Bambi Arbogast. The company is later stated to have designed Sam Wilson's winged flight gear, as well as the redesigned Helicarriers' propulsion systems. After S.H.I.E.L.D. is dissolved, Maria Hill is seen applying for a position at the Human Resources department of Stark Industries.

The company also has a negative impact, with Wanda and Pietro Maximoff recalling their childhood in the fictional nation of Sokovia, where the apartment in which the Maximoff family was living was attacked with Stark Industries-manufactured mortar shells, killing their parents. This would prove to be the basis for their hatred of Stark.

A former Stark Industries warehouse later becomes the new Avengers headquarters. It is revealed in 2016 that Damage Control is a joint venture between Stark Industries and the U.S. government to clean up New York City in the aftermath of the invasion.

In 2024, a group of disgruntled former Stark Industries employees led by Quentin Beck create a fabricated superhero named Mysterio using the Stark Industries augmented reality technology "B.A.R.F." to wreak havoc while using drones to pose as the Elementals. They are stopped by Peter Parker, but William Ginter Riva managed to leak Spider-Man's identity to DailyBugle.com.

It appeared in the films Iron Man, The Incredible Hulk, Iron Man 2, Captain America: The First Avenger, The Avengers, Iron Man 3, Captain America: The Winter Soldier, Avengers: Age of Ultron, Ant-Man, Captain America: Civil War, Spider-Man: Homecoming, Avengers: Infinity War, Avengers: Endgame, Spider-Man: Far From Home, and Spider-Man: No Way Home; the Marvel One-Shot The Consultant; as well as the ABC series Agents of S.H.I.E.L.D. and Agent Carter and the Disney+ series WandaVision, What If...?, and Hawkeye.

The Daily Bugle

The Daily Bugle (formerly TheDailyBugle.net) is a sensationalist news outlet modeled on Alex Jones' InfoWars headquartered in New York City and hosted by J. Jonah Jameson. In 2024, the site released doctored footage incriminating Spider-Man for the death of Mysterio and exposed his secret identity as Peter Parker. Betty Brant later joins the company under an internship as Jameson's correspondent.

It appeared in the MCU films Spider-Man: Far From Home and Spider-Man: No Way Home, a series of viral marketing videos on YouTube and TikTok of the same name, as well as in the mid-credits scene of the Sony's Spider-Man Universe (SSU) film Venom: Let There Be Carnage.

WHIH World News
WHIH World News is a television network and subsidiary of VistaCorp that reports political, scientific, and entertainment news. Its program WHIH Newsfront is anchored by Christine Everhart and Will Adams. Over the years, it has covered stories on the bombings of Sokovia, Tony Stark's "I am Iron Man" press conference, the opening ceremony of the 2011 Stark Expo, a clash between the Hulk and the military at Culver University, the aftermath of the Hydra Uprising, Wilson Fisk's thoughts on Daredevil, the Battle of Sokovia, Scott Lang's break-in of VistaCorp, the creation of the Advanced Threat Containment Unit (ATCU), the reemergence of Danny Rand, an interview with Dr. Stephen Strange, the appointment of Thaddeus Ross as Secretary of State, the aftermath of the Lagos Incident, the signing of the Sokovia Accords, the return of the Punisher, reported sightings of the Inhumans, the activities of the Runaways, an alien attack in New York City, worldwide celebrations following the Blip, the appointment of John Walker as the new Captain America, and the Flag Smashers' attack on the Global Repatriation Council in New York.

It appeared in the films The Incredible Hulk, Iron Man 2, Black Widow, and Eternals; the ABC series Agents of S.H.I.E.L.D. and Inhumans, the Netflix series Daredevil, Jessica Jones, Luke Cage, Iron Fist, and The Punisher, the Hulu series Runaways, and the Disney+ series WandaVision and The Falcon and the Winter Soldier; and is the main focus of the web series WHIH Newsfront, which served as a viral marketing campaign for Ant-Man and Captain America: Civil War.

X-Con Security Consultants
X-Con Security Consultants is a security company founded by Scott Lang, Luis, Dave, and Kurt. While Scott is under house arrest for violating the Sokovia Accords, it is run by Luis.

It appeared in the film Ant-Man and the Wasp.

Criminal organizations

Black Widows
The Black Widows are a group of assassins, part of the Red Room program led by General Dreykov. The program takes young orphan girls and turns them into elite assassins named "Black Widows", and is overseen by various individuals, including Madame B. and Melina Vostokoff. Graduates of the program include Natasha Romanoff and Yelena Belova. The program sends assassins, called Widows, to perform missions, and following Romanoff's escape from the program adopts mind control techniques to prevent their defection. It was terminated in 2016 following the destruction of the Red Room's headquarters by Romanoff and Belova, and each surviving Widow went their separate ways.

They appeared in the film Black Widow; as well as the Disney+ series Hawkeye.

Council of Kangs

The Council of Kangs is an assembly consisting of numerous variants of Kang the Conqueror across the multiverse, such as Immortus, Rama-Tut, and Centurion.

They appeared in the mid-credits scene of the film Ant-Man and the Wasp: Quantumania.

Flag Smashers

The Flag Smashers are a team of anarchists who oppose all forms of nationalism, believing that life was better during the Blip. The group posts messages in online forums and leave clues around the world with augmented reality. Led by Karli Morgenthau, its members have enhanced strength due to taking the Super Soldier Serum, given to them by the Power Broker. They eventually turn on the Power Broker, who is later revealed to be Sharon Carter.

They appeared in the Disney+ series The Falcon and the Winter Soldier.

Hydra

Hydra is the former science research division of Adolf Hitler's Nazi Party and a covert terrorist organization responsible for infiltrating S.H.I.E.L.D. during the modern day. Hydra was originally founded as an Inhuman cult dedicated to worshipping Hive and continued to exist throughout the centuries before it became part of Nazi Germany under Hitler. The modern incarnation was created by Hitler to pursue methods of creating advanced weaponry to help the Axis Powers win World War II. Initially led by Johann Schmidt, Hydra acquired the Tesseract and conducted research on it to harness the energy it released to power weapons. Hydra's allegiance to its Nazi superiors grew to be only superficial; as Schmidt intended to harness the potential of the Tesseract to overthrow Hitler and eventually the world, believing that mankind could not be trusted with its own freedom. However, during the war, Hydra learned, particularly due to Steve Rogers' attacks on their operations, that humanity will always fight for its freedom. After Schmidt's disappearance and Rogers' successful efforts to botch Schmidt's plans to attack cities around the world, Hydra was defeated and fell. Following World War II, S.H.I.E.L.D. was founded by former members of the Strategic Scientific Reserve, and employed Operation Paperclip, recruiting former Hydra scientists with strategic value. As part of the process, Arnim Zola was recruited and then subsequently began to reform Hydra secretly from within S.H.I.E.L.D. Operating discreetly within S.H.I.E.L.D., Hydra staged political coups, wars (including the Cold War), and assassinations (including those of Howard and Maria Stark), intending to destabilize world governments and drive humanity to surrender its freedom in exchange for security. Hydra agent Gideon Malick (portrayed by Powers Boothe) infiltrated the World Security Council. Hydra's operations were later exposed by Rogers once S.H.I.E.L.D. fell, and their remnants were pursued and defeated by the Avengers and by remaining S.H.I.E.L.D. agents.

It appeared in the films Captain America: The First Avenger, Captain America: The Winter Soldier, Avengers: Age of Ultron, Ant-Man, Captain America: Civil War, and Avengers: Endgame; as well as the ABC series Agents of S.H.I.E.L.D. and Agent Carter, and the Disney+ series WandaVision, The Falcon and the Winter Soldier, and What If...?.

Intelligencia

Intelligencia is an online criminal organization founded by Todd Phelps and other influential people that harass people belonging to discriminated groups.

They appeared in the Disney+ series She-Hulk: Attorney at Law.

Marauders
The Marauders were a group of space pirates who took advantage of the destruction of the Rainbow Bridge in Asgard and wreaked havoc across the Nine Realms, until they were stopped by Thor, Sif, the Warriors Three, and the Einherjar.

They appeared in the film Thor: The Dark World.

Ravagers

The Ravagers are an interstellar crime syndicate comprising thieves, smugglers, criminals, bandits, mercenaries, bounty hunters, and space pirates. There are nearly one hundred factions of Ravagers around the galaxy each led by an independent captain. Their moral code states that Ravagers do not steal from other Ravagers or deal in children.

They appeared in the films Guardians of the Galaxy, Guardians of the Galaxy Vol. 2, and Avengers: Endgame; as well as the Disney+ animated series What If...?.

Stakar Ogord's team

Stakar Ogord (portrayed by Sylvester Stallone) led his own team of Ravagers. Other members included Yondu Udonta, Aleta Ogord, Charlie-27, Martinex, Mainframe, and Krugarr (portrayed by Michael Rooker, Michelle Yeoh, Ving Rhames, Michael Rosenbaum, Miley Cyrus respectively, with Krugarr being portrayed through CGI). The team eventually disbanded, but was reunited following the death of their former teammate Yondu.

It appeared in the film Guardians of the Galaxy Vol. 2.

Ten Rings

The Ten Rings is a clandestine criminal organization founded one thousand years ago by the immortal warlord Xu Wenwu and named after his mystical ten rings. The group's name is an homage to the Mandarin's ten cosmic rings in Marvel Comics. In 1996, Wenwu disbanded the organization after marrying and starting a family, but reactivated the Ten Rings following the death of his wife, Ying Li.

In 2010, the Ten Rings is hired by Obadiah Stane to kidnap Tony Stark in Afghanistan, with the cell led by a man named Raza.

The Ten Rings also help arrange for Ivan Vanko to travel to Monaco to enact his revenge on Stark.

Years later, Aldrich Killian of AIM hires actor Trevor Slattery to pose as Wenwu; unfamiliar with Wenwu's history, Killian invents "the Mandarin" persona for Slattery and has him unwittingly broadcast propaganda messages claiming credit on behalf of the Ten Rings for explosions caused by AIM's failed Extremis experiments. However, following his arrest, Slattery is confronted by Jackson Norriss in prison, who reveals that he is a member of the group and that "the Mandarin" is real.

A member of the organization was also one of Darren Cross' potential buyers of his Yellowjacket suit.

Sometime after 2023, Wenwu begins hearing his deceased wife's voice, telling him she is trapped in her former home, Ta Lo. Wenwu dispatches his Ten Rings warriors to capture his estranged children Shang-Chi and Xialing for their pendants that can lead him to Ta Lo. Wenwu and the Ten Rings arrive in Ta Lo and attack the village to free Li. Unbeknownst to Wenwu, Li's voice was that of the sealed Dweller-in-Darkness, who manipulates him into releasing it and its minions. The Ten Rings form a truce with the villagers to fight the new threat. After Wenwu's death, Xialing becomes the new leader of the Ten Rings and starts restructuring it by incorporating more female recruits into the previously all-male organization.

The organization Ten Rings was an original creation of the Marvel Cinematic Universe. The organization resembles Si-Fan from Sax Rhomer's books. In the animated series Iron Man: Armored Adventures, Gene Khan, the Mandarin leads the Tong; tong is a name of a type of criminal organization of Chinese immigrants in the United States.

It appeared in the films Iron Man, Iron Man 2, Iron Man 3, Ant-Man, and Shang-Chi and the Legend of the Ten Rings; as well as the One-Shot All Hail the King.

The Ten Rings was later integrated into mainstream Marvel Universe.

Tivan Group
The Tivan Group is a powerful group led by the Collector. Responsible for the founding of the Exitar mining colony on Knowhere, the group wields enormous power and prestige in the criminal underworld of the cosmos.

It appeared in the films Thor: The Dark World, Guardians of the Galaxy, and Avengers: Infinity War; as well as the Disney+ animated series What If...?.

Tracksuit Mafia

The Tracksuit Mafia is a criminal organization operating in New York, with a history of being fought by Ronin, eventually revealed to be working for Wilson Fisk, under the orders of Maya Lopez / Echo. In the comics, they were known as the Tracksuit Draculas.

They appeared in the Disney+ series Hawkeye.

Wrecking Crew

The Wrecking Crew is a four-man criminal group wielding stolen enhanced Asgardian construction tools as weapons. The group's members consist of Wrecker, Piledriver, Bulldozer, and Thunderball. They were hired by an anonymous client to steal a sample of Jennifer Walters' gamma-irradiated blood, though she fights them off.

They appeared in the Disney+ series She-Hulk: Attorney at Law.

Zealots
The Zealots were a separatist faction of the Masters of the Mystic Arts led by Kaecilius. Kaecilius and his surviving disciples were given the immortality they had wanted all along from Dormammu. Unfortunately for them, the warnings they failed to heed turned out to be correct as the three were dragged into the Dark Dimension upon Doctor Strange defeating Dormammu.

They appeared in the film Doctor Strange.

Government agencies

Damage Control

The United States Department of Damage Control (DODC), often referred to as simply Damage Control, is a United States government agency, formerly a subunit of S.H.I.E.L.D.. 

In 2012, it is set up with the aid of Stark Industries in order to clean up after the Battle of New York. This drives Adrian Toomes' company out of business and leading the latter into his criminal life as the Vulture. 

In 2016, DODC agents arrive to clean up a destroyed bank and deli-grocery store. 

In 2024, DODC agents, led by P. Cleary, arrive at Peter Parker's apartment. They bring him, his aunt May, and friends, Ned Leeds and Michelle Jones, to the NYPD precinct for interrogation after his identity as Spider-Man was made public and he was framed for the murder of Mysterio. Later, DODC agents arrive at Happy Hogan's condominium and witness the fight going on between Parker and multiversal displaced people, before opening fire on Parker when he is in view.

In 2025, DODC agents Cleary and Sadie Deever launch an investigation into Jersey City resident and emerging superhero Kamala Khan, after she is suspected to have caused significant damages and injuries during the local AvengerCon exhibit. Their methods for tracking her draw significant controversy among the public, particularly garnering ire from the city's Muslim-American community upon their attempt to (in Cleary's case, reluctantly) raid a mosque related to Khan's associates. Eventually, Cleary orders Deever to forfeit the operation as a result of the public backlash, with Deever opting to proceed with capturing Khan, Kamran, and their friends at Coles Academic High School. Deever's raid subsequently draws the attention of Jersey City locals, allowing them to intervene and stop Damage Control from capturing Khan, who eventually flees the scene after consoling Kamran. The ensuing events cause Deever to be fired from her position by Cleary for her inability to comply with orders and for putting children at risk.

That same year, DODC agents arrive at an annual Awards Gala in Los Angeles, California to apprehend Jennifer Walters and put her in their supermax prison. 

It appeared in the films Spider-Man: Homecoming and Spider-Man: No Way Home; as well as the Disney+ series Ms. Marvel and She-Hulk: Attorney at Law.

Global Repatriation Council
The Global Repatriation Council, abbreviated as the GRC, is an international organization established by world governments following the Blip that is responsible for managing resources for refugees displaced by the Blip.

It appeared in the Disney+ series The Falcon and the Winter Soldier.

Nova Corps

The Nova Corps was the intergalactic military and police force of the Nova Empire that was headquartered on the planet Xandar. Led by the Nova Prime, the Nova Corps initially arrest the Guardians of the Galaxy on Xandar after they cause a public disturbance and send them to the Kyln, a secure prison. Later, during the Battle of Xandar, the Corps defend Xandar from Ronan the Accuser along with the Guardians, but are almost completely obliterated by Ronan using the Power Stone. Following the battle, the Corps expunge each of the Guardians' criminal records in gratitude, while the Orb is placed in the Corps' possession for safekeeping. Four years later, the Nova Corps was presumed to have been annihilated by Thanos during the decimation of Xandar in search of the Power Stone as mentioned by Thor. Other notable members of the Corps include Rhomann Dey and Denarian Garthan Saal.

The film version of the Nova Corps acts as a traditional police force, with no mention of the Nova Force. When asked about a Nova solo movie, James Gunn said "I think there is always a chance of a Nova movie."

It appeared in the film Guardians of the Galaxy and the animated Disney+ series What If...?.

S.H.I.E.L.D.

The Strategic Homeland Intervention, Enforcement, and Logistics Division, better known by its acronym S.H.I.E.L.D., is an intelligence agency founded by Peggy Carter, Howard Stark, and Chester Phillips following World War II as the successor to the Strategic Scientific Reserve. High-ranking agents and scientists throughout S.H.I.E.L.D.'s history include Hank Pym, Janet Van Dyne, Arnim Zola, and Bill Foster; Pym and van Dyne operated covertly as the Ant-Man and the Wasp on behalf of S.H.I.E.L.D. from the 1960s until 1989 and 1987, respectively. In the early 21st century, Nick Fury was promoted to the position of Director by Secretary Alexander Pierce, who was secretly working for Hydra. In 2010, Agent Phil Coulson was sent to speak with Tony Stark and Pepper Potts following his kidnapping in Afghanistan, but before he could do so Stark became involved in a battle with Obadiah Stane in an advanced armored suit. Later, in a press conference, Stark publicly declares himself as "Iron Man", prompting Fury to approach him on the "Avengers Initiative". S.H.I.E.L.D. was also involved in an attack by an army of unmanned drones at the Stark Expo, monitored the activity of Dr. Bruce Banner, witnessed the arrival of Thor in Puente Antiguo, New Mexico, and recovered the long-lost body of Captain America. In 2012, Fury assembled a team which consisted of six extraordinary individuals known as the Avengers in response to the theft of the Tesseract by Loki, leading to the Battle of New York. Following the incident, Fury secretly revives Coulson (who was killed by Loki) via Project T.A.H.I.T.I., while Rogers joins S.H.I.E.L.D..

During the Hydra Uprising, Hydra was revealed to have been secretly infiltrating S.H.I.E.L.D. for years, culminating in the destruction of the Triskelion, three Helicarriers, and Project Insight, along with the collapse of both S.H.I.E.L.D. and Hydra. S.H.I.E.L.D. was secretly revived by Phil Coulson and Nick Fury, the latter assisting the Avengers during the Battle of Sokovia.

It appeared in the films Iron Man, The Incredible Hulk, Iron Man 2, Thor, Captain America: The First Avenger, The Avengers, Captain America: The Winter Soldier, Avengers: Age of Ultron, Ant-Man, Ant-Man and the Wasp, Captain Marvel, Spider-Man: Far From Home and Black Widow; the Marvel One-Shots The Consultant, A Funny Thing Happened on the Way to Thor's Hammer, Item 47, and Agent Carter; as well as the ABC series Agents of S.H.I.E.L.D. and the Disney+ series What If...?.

S.T.R.I.K.E.

S.T.R.I.K.E. is a unit of S.H.I.E.L.D. led by Steve Rogers, but also infiltrated by Hydra moles such as Brock Rumlow. A glimpse of S.H.I.E.L.D. records in The Avengers show that Natasha Romanoff and Clint Barton were partnered together under S.T.R.I.K.E. Team Delta.

It appeared in the films Captain America: The Winter Soldier and Avengers: Endgame; as well as the Disney+ series What If...?.

Strategic Scientific Reserve
The Strategic Scientific Reserve, or SSR, was a top secret Allied war agency during World War II, founded by Chester Phillips, Howard Stark and Peggy Carter, on the orders of Franklin D. Roosevelt. It was based in London. It was later replaced by S.H.I.E.L.D., with all operations taken over by Nick Fury.

It appeared in the film Captain America: The First Avenger, the ABC series Agents of S.H.I.E.L.D. and Agent Carter, and the Disney+ series What If...?.

S.W.O.R.D.

The Sentient Weapon Observation and Response Division, better known by its acronym S.W.O.R.D., is an intelligence agency that was founded by Maria Rambeau. In 2020, Rambeau died from cancer, prompting Tyler Hayward to succeed her by becoming the new acting director. Under Hayward's directives, S.W.O.R.D. obtained the Vision's corpse and began the process of attempting to re-activate it. In 2023, two weeks following the Blip, Wanda Maximoff created an anomaly around the town of Westview, New Jersey, prompting S.W.O.R.D. to send one of its agents, Monica Rambeau, to assist FBI agent Jimmy Woo in investigating it. After Rambeau is accidentally sucked inside the anomaly, Hayward and other S.W.O.R.D. members set up a temporary response base outside the town, bringing in Darcy Lewis to further investigate the anomaly. Later, Hayward successfully re-activates the Vision through exposure to Wanda's power from a drone, and sends it inside the anomaly to kill Maximoff and the Vision simulacrum. Following a tense confrontation between the Maximoff family, S.W.O.R.D., and Agatha Harkness, Hayward is arrested, and Monica meets with a Skrull posing as an FBI agent.

S.W.O.R.D. was originally intended to appear in Thor, in a deleted post-credits scene wherein Erik Selvig tells Jane Foster and Darcy to "cross reference ... with the S.W.O.R.D. database". However, due to complications with 20th Century Fox, which owned the film rights to S.W.O.R.D. members Lockheed and Abigail Brand at the time, the scene was cut. The creative team behind the TV show Agents of S.H.I.E.L.D. intended to incorporate S.W.O.R.D., but were refused permission by Marvel Studios.

It appeared in the Disney+ series WandaVision.

War Dogs
War Dogs are sleeper agents responsible for covert operations and gathering intelligence for Wakanda. They are branded with a tattoo on their lips to identify themselves when prompted. In 1992, King T'Chaka visited his brother N'Jobu in Oakland, California, where he was stationed as a War Dog. Revealing that he had sent Zuri to spy on him, T'Chaka demanded to know why N'Jobu had helped black-market arms dealer Ulysses Klaue steal a cache of vibranium from Wakanda before killing him in order to save Zuri's life.

In 2016, War Dog member Nakia is rescued by T'Challa and Okoye whilst undertaking a mission in Nigeria, and is taken back to Wakanda to attend T'Chaka's funeral. Later, after N'Jadaka ascends to the Wakandan throne, he orders W'Kabi to deliver vibranium to War Dogs stationed around the world, but this plot was thwarted by resistance from T'Challa and his allies in Wakanda.

They appeared in the film Black Panther.

World Security Council
The World Security Council is an international council formed of politicians from some of the world's most powerful countries that function as oversight for S.H.I.E.L.D. Its stated aims are facilitating cooperation in international law, international security, economic development, social progress, human rights, and achievement of world peace.

It appeared in the films The Avengers and Captain America: The Winter Soldier.

Others

Einherjar

The Einherjar is the army of Asgard who have been serving the Asgardian throne since the time of Odin's father, Bor. Over the millennia, they have fought the Dark Elves, the Frost Giants, and the Marauders, as well as Hela and Thanos's forces. Their current leader is Tyr.

It appeared in the films Thor, Thor: The Dark World, Thor: Ragnarok, Avengers: Endgame, and Thor: Love and Thunder; as well as the Disney+ series What If...?.

Illuminati

The Illuminati is an organization established by an alternate version of Stephen Strange in Earth-838. They are intended to monitor and apprehend potential threats to the wider multiverse. Joining Strange as council members are Maria Rambeau / Captain Marvel, Peggy Carter / Captain Carter, Blackagar Boltagon / Black Bolt, Professor Charles Xavier, and Reed Richards. When Strange recklessly uses the Darkhold to prevent Thanos's invasion of their world, he was deemed a threat to the multiverse by his peers, leading him to be executed by Boltagon and subsequently replaced by the succeeding Sorcerer Supreme, Karl Mordo. Some time later, the Illuminati arrest and imprison the Stephen Strange of Earth-616, as they fear he and his companion America Chavez pose a similar threat. However, their attempt to decide his fate is interrupted by a corrupted Wanda Maximoff from Earth-616, who infiltrates their headquarters and slaughters every member of the organization (except for Mordo) while Strange, Chavez and that reality's Christine Palmer pursue the Book of Vishanti to subdue her.

They appeared in the film Doctor Strange in the Multiverse of Madness.

Masters of the Mystic Arts
The Masters of the Mystic Arts are an order of sorcerers dedicated to protecting the world from mystical threats. They originated in the time of Agamotto, and through the centuries developed into their current form. Notable current and former members include Dr. Stephen Strange, Wong, the Ancient One, Karl Mordo / Baron Mordo, Kaecilius, Jonathan Pangborn, Daniel Drumm, Hamir, Tina Minoru, Sol Rama and Rintrah.

They appeared in the films Doctor Strange, Avengers: Endgame and Doctor Strange in the Multiverse of Madness.

Red Daggers
The Order of the Red Daggers, or simply Red Daggers, is an order of mystic warriors based in Pakistan and dedicated to protecting the world from inter-dimensional and supernatural threats. Specifically, they take interest in tracking down and eliminating the Clandestines, djinn who are trying to tear down the Veil of Noor in order to merge their home-world with Earth. Notable current and former members include Kareem and Waleed.

They appeared in the Disney+ series Ms. Marvel.

Time Variance Authority

The Time Variance Authority, better known by its initialism TVA, is an organization which was created by He Who Remains (a variant of Kang the Conqueror) that monitors the various timelines of the multiverse, including the preservation of the Sacred Timeline. He Who Remains created the TVA to stop evil multiversal variants of himself from coming into being after a "multiversal war" waged between them led to him destroying the multiverse to stop them, by keeping the "Sacred Timeline" in check. In building the TVA, he pulled variants of various people from across time, erased their memories, made them believe they and the TVA were created by the Time-Keepers, and built androids to serve as the Time-Keepers. Miss Minutes is the TVA's animated anthropomorphic clock mascot, and the Atlanta Marriott Marquis hotel was used to portray the TVA Headquarters.

In an alternate 2012 created by the Avengers Time Heist, Loki escaped from Stark Tower with the Tesseract following his defeat, leading TVA agents to take him into custody. It is later revealed by Sylvie to Loki that all TVA agents are Variants taken from different times by He Who Remains. He Who Remains is murdered by Sylvie after she rejects his offer to run the TVA with her variant Loki while Mobius and B-15 simultaneously shut down TVA operations after learning they are variants, creating a new multiverse. Loki finds himself in a different TVA run by a variant of He Who Remains, Kang the Conqueror, and encounters different versions of Mobius and B-15.

It appeared in the Disney+ series Loki.

See also
 Characters of the Marvel Cinematic Universe
 Species of the Marvel Cinematic Universe
 Features of the Marvel Cinematic Universe

References

External links
 TheDailyBugle.net – viral marketing website

Lists of fictional organizations
Marvel Cinematic Universe features
Marvel Cinematic Universe lists